Rear Admiral James William Dunbar "Bill" Cook  (12 December 1921 – 26 January 2007) was a senior Royal Navy officer.

Naval career
Born on 12 December 1921, James Dunbar Cook was educated at Bedford School and HMS Worcester. He was commander of HMS Venus, HMS Dido and HMS Norfolk. He was senior british naval officer in South Africa, between 1967 and 1969, director of the Royal Naval War College, between 1969 and 1971, and assistant chief of the naval staff, between 1973 and 1975.

Rear Admiral James Dunbar Cook retired from the Royal Navy in 1975 and was invested as a Companion of the Order of the Bath in the 1975 New Year Honours. He died on 26 January 2007.

References

1921 births
2007 deaths
Companions of the Order of the Bath
People educated at Bedford School
People from Elgin, Moray
Royal Navy rear admirals
Royal Navy officers of World War II